Swedish National Board of Fisheries was a Swedish government agency within the Ministry of Rural Affairs. It was located in Gothenburg and was the central government authority for fisheries in Sweden. It was established in 1948. It ceased to exist on 1 July 2011.

See also
Government agencies in Sweden.

External links
Swedish National Board of Fisheries (Redirected to Swedish Agency for Marine and Water Management )

Board of Fisheries
Economy of Sweden